Munkhkhairkhan National Park is centered on Mönkhkhairkhan Mountain, the second highest mountain in Mongolia.  The park straddles Bayan-Ölgii Province and Khovd Province in the Mongol-Altai Mountains of western Mongolia, 15 km from the border with China.

Topography
The mountain features glaciers and snowfields, with glacial activity leaving steep slopes of rock and gravel.

Climate and ecoregion
The climate of the area is Cold semi-arid climate (Köppen climate classification (BSk)). This climate is characteristic of steppe climates intermediary between desert humid climates, and typically have precipitation is above evapotranspiration.  At least one month averages below .  Precipitation in the Munkhkhairkhan region averages 76 - 158 mm/year.

Flora and fauna
The valleys and low foothills area covered with shrubs, sagebrush and other dry steppe vegetation.  Higher elevations support mountain meadows with grasses such as Koeleria.  The park reports 15 square kilometers of Larch forest along the rivers in the lowest valleys.

See also
 List of national parks of Mongolia

References

External links
 Park borders, Munkhkhairkhan-Uenchiin khavtsal National Park, ProtectedPlanet.net

National parks of Mongolia